Lac La Plonge is a hamlet in Saskatchewan. It is located on the north shore of Lac la Plonge, a glacial lake, within the Canadian Shield and the Boreal Forest.

Division No. 18, Unorganized, Saskatchewan
Unincorporated communities in Saskatchewan